The Musée Hector-Berlioz (Hector Berlioz Museum) is a museum about the composer Hector Berlioz, in La Côte-Saint-André, Isère, France. The building is the composer's birthplace.

History
The house was built about 1680; about 50 years later it was acquired by Berlioz's great-grandparents, and largely rebuilt at about that time. Hector Berlioz was born here on 11 December 1803, and lived here until he was 18. It continued to be occupied by the family until the death of the composer's father Dr Louis Berlioz in 1848. The town placed a memorial plaque on the house in 1885.

In 1932 the building was donated by Madame Dumien, who had purchased the property, to the Association des amis de Berlioz. It was established as a museum, officially inaugurated by the Minister of State Édouard Herriot on 7 July 1935. It was listed as a monument historique in 1942. In 1968 it became the property of the Department of Isère.

The building has been developed several times, most recently in 2002–2003, the bicentenary of the composer's birth. The award Maisons des Illustres ("Houses of the illustrious") has been given to the museum.

Exhibits
The rooms show aspects of Berlioz's life, through his correspondence, music scores and other exhibits. There is a temporary exhibition each year in the cellars of the house.

See also 
 List of music museums

References

Biographical museums in France
Music museums in France
Museums in Isère
Hector Berlioz
Berlioz
Maisons des Illustres